Isaac Shai (born 26 February 1971) is a South African former footballer who played at both professional and international levels as a midfielder. Shai played club football for Mamelodi Sundowns; he also earned seven caps for the South African national side between 1997 and 2002.

External links

1971 births
Living people
South African soccer players
South Africa international soccer players
2000 African Cup of Nations players
Mamelodi Sundowns F.C. players
Association football midfielders